Sparganothina refugiana is a species of moth of the family Tortricidae. It is found in Peru.

Their wingspan is about 23 mm. The ground color of their forewings areyellowish, consisting of series of transverse blotches. The markings are brownish with a slight violet hue. The hindwings are yellowish, but darker terminally where a few pale brownish strigulae (fine streaks) are found.

Etymology
The species name is derived from the word refugium.

References

Moths described in 2010
Sparganothini
Moths of South America
Taxa named by Józef Razowski